Diamond Hill-Jarvis High School is a school in Fort Worth, Texas, United States which serves grades 9 through 12. The school is a part of the Fort Worth Independent School District. The principal is James Garcia. 

The school logo is the eagle, the school colors are black and scarlet, and the school motto is "we are Diamond Hill."

History
Diamond Hill-Jarvis High School opened in 1904 as Diamond Hill School. In 1906, its campus moved from 28th Street to Hutchinson and Oscar. The first graduating class comprised 3 students who graduated in 1913.

In 1924, Diamond Hill School became part of the Forth Worth Public School System. The school mascot was changed to the eagle from the hilltopper in 1927. Students were relocated to North Side High School between 1931 and 1933 while the school was renovated.

In 1952–1971, the original buildings were used as an elementary school as the new campus located on Maydell was opened. The original Diamond Hill School buildings were torn down in 1971.

In 2006, it was placed 95th on Newsweek magazine's top 1200 high schools list. In 2021, the men's soccer team went to state for the first time in history. Students also participate in tennis, cross country, football, golf, softball, baseball, track, and powerlifting.

Feeder patterns 
Elementary schools that feed into Diamond Hill-Jarvis include Diamond Hill Elementary, Cesar Chavez Elementary, Helbing Elementary, M.H. Moore, and Washington Heights.

W.A. Meacham Middle School feeds into Diamond Hill-Jarvis.

References

External links
 Diamond Hill-Jarvis High School

Public high schools in Fort Worth, Texas
Fort Worth Independent School District high schools